The Knitting Needles (German: Die Stricknadeln) is a 1916 German silent comedy film directed by Hubert Moest and Otto Rippert and starring Erich Kaiser-Titz, Käthe Haack and Olga Engl.

Cast
 Erich Kaiser-Titz as August von Kotzebue / Baron 
 Käthe Haack as Junge Baronin 
 Olga Engl as Alte Baronin 
 Reinhold Schünzel
 Josef Coenen 
 Lina Salten

References

Bibliography
 Bock, Hans-Michael & Bergfelder, Tim. The Concise CineGraph. Encyclopedia of German Cinema. Berghahn Books, 2009.

External links

1916 films
Films of the German Empire
German silent feature films
Films directed by Otto Rippert
Films directed by Hubert Moest
German black-and-white films
1916 comedy films
German comedy films
German films based on plays
Silent comedy films
1910s German films
1910s German-language films